Gauri Narayan Sah Teli is a Nepalese politician who is elected member of Provincial Assembly of Madhesh Province from Loktantrik Samajbadi Party, Nepal. Sah, a resident of Brahmapuri, Sarlahi was elected to the 2017 provincial assembly election from Sarlahi 2(A).

Electoral history

2017 Nepalese provincial elections

References

External links

Living people
Members of the Provincial Assembly of Madhesh Province
Madhesi people
People from Sarlahi District
Loktantrik Samajwadi Party, Nepal politicians
1945 births